Deitrick Vaughn Haddon (born May 17, 1973) is an American gospel singer, songwriter, pianist, arranger, record producer, pastor, and actor. He is best known for progressive gospel, and contemporary styles of music. He is also one of the cast members in Oxygen's reality television show Preachers of L.A.

Early years

Haddon launched his solo career as a Christian R&B vocalist with the Lost & Found on Tyscot/Verity in 2002. The set peaked at No. 1 on Billboard's Top Gospel Charts and received wide critical acclaim and spawned the hit "Sinner's Prayer" which was played extensively on gospel and mainstream R&B radio stations.
                                                              
The 1970s-leaning Crossroads followed in 2004, led off by the upbeat single "God is Good". In an uncharacteristic move for marketing a gospel album, Haddon made an appearance on the long-running syndicated series Soul Train performing the single and the title track from the album.

Haddon appeared to be pushing his Gospel artistry further into the ranks of mainstream venues with 7 Days, released October 10, 2006. 7 Days was produced almost entirely by R&B producers Tim & Bob Balancing out the contemporary bulk of the album is the traditional gospel-flavored lead single "Heaven Knows" which Haddon produced himself.

Haddon and his brother Gerald also produced the comeback album Brand New Day for veteran gospel vocalist Vanessa Bell Armstrong.
Deitrick Haddon & Voices of Unity's Live the Life won Gospel Music Workshop of America Excellence Awards for "New Artist of the Year—Urban Contemporary" and "Album of the Year—Urban Contemporary".

On September 2, 2008, Haddon released an album called Revealed. This album includes the popular single, "Love Him Like I Do" (featuring Mary Mary and Ruben Studdard). On July 27, 2010 Haddon made his film debut in a movie released directly to DVD called Blessed and Cursed.

On January 25, 2012, Haddon released Church on the Moon, his fifth album with Verity Records. The album debuted at No. 1 on the Billboards Top Gospel charts and No. 65 on the Billboard 200.

Haddon is part of the cast of the reality television show Preachers of L.A., which chronicles the lives of six Los Angeles preachers, including Haddon. The show began airing on October 9, 2013 and airs on the Oxygen network in the United States.

Television
In 2019, Deitrick Haddon starred as Clarence Burnett in the TV One original summer movie Sins of the Father.

Discography

Studio albums

Live albums

Compilation albums

Soundtrack albums

Singles

Personal life
In 1996, Haddon married Damita Chandler. They pastored together the church that Deitrick's father founded: Kingdom Culture Church of Detroit. They remained together for 15 years before a divorce in 2011. Haddon is now married to his second wife, Dominique Haddon (née McTyer). The couple have two daughters, Destin and Denver, and one son, Deitrick II. Haddon and his wife are now the Founders/Senior Pastors of Hill City Church in Los Angeles, where Haddon is founder/senior pastor and Dominique is executive pastor.

External links

Deitrick on MySpace
Billboard review of Revealed
Official site to the Church On the Moon album
Download Deitrick Haddon's Discography

References

1973 births
Living people
African-American male songwriters
American gospel singers
Urban contemporary gospel musicians
Singers from Detroit
21st-century African-American male singers
Singer-songwriters from Michigan